Patrick Boivin (born 1975) is a Canadian filmmaker and animator. In addition to directing, he is often involved in the lighting, editing, animation, special effects and even music in his films.

His short film Ça pis tout l’reste (That, and everything else) was chosen by Quebec Gold as one of the top 10 short films from Quebec in 2008. Boivin was also one of the group of nine writers who produced an experimental sketch comedy television series for Télé-Québec titled Phylactère Cola, which aired in 2002 and 2003.

His films have been featured at numerous international film festivals around the world, including the Montreal World Film Festival, the Commonwealth Film Festival (UK) and the Festival de Namur (Belgium). Boivin started his creative career by drawing comic books and, in his words, “quickly discovered that it was faster to tell a story with video." He cites Tom Waits, Roy Andersson, Federico Fellini and Paul Thomas Anderson as influences on his style.

He won a Gémeaux Award for Best Direction in a Comedy Series in 2002 for Phylactère Cola, and his short film Radio received a Jutra Award nomination for Best Live Action Short Film at the 8th Jutra Awards in 2006.

Many of Boivin's short films have been released to YouTube. He created the stop motion videos for the songs "King of the Dogs" by Iggy Pop and "Playboy" by Indochine. He also created viral clips such as Iron Baby, Iron Man vs Bruce Lee and Dragon Baby. In 2011, Boivin developed his first video game for iOS entitled Crottey Bunny's Scratch N' Dance under the name Monsieur Boivin, a company he started with his brother.

Filmography
La Lettre
Radio
White
I shot your ex-girlfriend
Cuts Kill Culture
Paranoland
Nosferatu Rising
The First Spaceshit on the Moon
Redite
Jazz With a General Problem
Batman vs Joker (BBoy Joker)
Iron Man vs Bruce Lee  
Black Ox Skateboard
Mandalorian Dance
Bumblebee boy
Michael Jackson vs Mr. Bean
Ninjas UnBoxing
La Fin du Neoliberalisme/ No Big Deal
IRON BABY
AT-AT Day Afternoon
LEGO Bionicle Stars shorts
Official Cars 2 trailer in Lego
Dragon Baby
Bunker

References

External links
 
 

1975 births
Living people
Artists from Montreal
Canadian animated film directors
Film directors from Montreal
Stop motion animators